The Royal Hotel is a grade II listed building which is in the English seaside resort town of Great Yarmouth in the county of Norfolk, United Kingdom.

Location
It is on the seafront and Victoria Road is behind it and so is Wellington Road.

History 
This hotel was built in 1840 and was then called  the Victoria Hotel. It was then renamed the Royal Hotel and at this time was the last and most southern hotel on the seafront. In 1847 the English writer and social critic Charles Dickens stayed in the hotel, along with his friend and colleague Mark Lemon who was the founding editor of both Punch and The Field. at the time Dickens was occupied writing his Novel David Copperfield which was first published as a serial. During his stay at the hotel, Dickens had described Great Yarmouth to his wife in a letter thus  Yarmouth was the most wondrous sight his eyes had ever beheld. He also, during this visit met James Sharman who was the keeper of the Britannia Monument, on whom he supposedly based the character of Ham Peggotty.
In the hotel's Palm court, a menu which has been signed by Dickens during his stay there is on display.

Refurbishment
The hotel was re-furbished and extended in 1877 by the Norwich architect J B Pearce.

Royal Patronage 
King Edward VII stayed at the hotel in the latter part of the 1800s where he is reported to have entertained his mistress, music hall singer and stage actress, Lily Langtree, better known as the Jersey Lily. The hotel still displays the crest of Edward VII on the front façade of the hotel. It is well-known and bona fide that Her Majesty the Queen sent a special message to the hotel during a visit to Great Yarmouth

References

Grade II listed buildings in Norfolk
Hotels in Great Yarmouth
Hotels established in 1840